Horațiu-Valentin Mălăele (born 31 iulie 1952) is a Romanian actor, cartoonist, writer, and theater and film director. In this last capacity he is often associated with the Romanian New Wave.

Born in 1952 Târgu-Jiu, he had a public art exhibit in his final year of secondary school, the first of over 30 as of 2016.

Mălăele graduated in 1975 from the Institute of Theater and Cinema in Bucharest and first became a professional actor with the National Theater of Romania in Piatra Neamț. He returned to Bucharest, where he became a prominent actor, working in many of Romania's leading theaters including Nottara, Odeon, and Bulandra. He then became a director, directing such plays as O sărbătoare princiară ("A Princely Feast") by Theodor Mazilu (1982 at Nottara Theatre), A Flea in Her Ear by Georges Feydeau (1993 at Nottara Theatre), and Carlo contra Carlo ("Carlo against Carlo") by Paul Ioachim (1994 at the Odeon), which won him that year's Romanian Comedy Festival Prize. He has since directed over a dozen other stage productions.

He first appeared as a film actor in 1974, appearing in two films that year: Păcală ("Caution") and Muntele Ascuns ("The Hidden Mountain", and has gone on to act in over two dozen other films. He also directed Palaria ("The Hat", 2004, TV movie), Nunta mută ("Silent Wedding", 2008), Funeralii fericite ("Happy Funerals", 2013) and Luca (2020).

He has also written two books: the autobiographical Horaţiu despre Mălăele ("Horatiu about Malaele", and Wanderings, a collection of short episodes, aphorisms, and memories.

Selected filmography

Notes

External links
  (in Romanian)
 

1952 births
Romanian actors
Romanian film directors
Romanian theatre directors
Romanian writers
Romanian cartoonists
Living people